Jonathan Vipond III (born January 9, 1945) is a former Republican member of the Pennsylvania House of Representatives.

References

Politicians from Scranton, Pennsylvania
Williams College alumni
Republican Party members of the Pennsylvania House of Representatives
1945 births
Living people